The 2007 Mountain West Conference men's basketball tournament was played at the Thomas & Mack Center in Las Vegas, Nevada from March 8–10, 2007.  Tournament host UNLV upset regular season league champion BYU 78–70 to claim the Mountain West Conference tournament title and the league's automatic bid to the NCAA Tournament.  It was UNLV's first tournament title since winning the inaugural tournament in 2000 (though they had previously lost 3 consecutive championship games from 2002–2004).

2007 marked the return of the tournament to the Thomas & Mack Center after a three-year stint in Denver.

Tournament Bracket 

Mountain West Conference men's basketball tournament
Tournament
Mountain West Conference men's basketball tournament
Mountain West Conference men's basketball tournament